Edward William Binney FRS, FGS (1812–1882) was an English geologist.

Background 
Edward William Binney was born at Morton, in Nottinghamshire in 1812, and educated at Queen Elizabeth's Grammar School, Gainsborough. He was articled to a solicitor in Chesterfield, and settled in Manchester in 1836. He retired soon afterwards from legal practice and gave his chief attention to geological pursuits.

Geological Research 
Working especially on the Carboniferous and Permian rocks of the north of England, he also studied the Drift deposits of Lancashire, which resulted in him and Joseph Dalton Hooker finding the first coal balls, and made himself familiar with the geology of the area around Manchester. On the Coal Measures in particular he became an acknowledged authority, and his Observations on the Structure of Fossil Plants found in the Carboniferous Strata (1868–75) formed one of the monographs of the Palaeontographical Society. His large collection of fossils was placed in Owens College, Manchester.

Activities 
Binney assisted in founding the Manchester Geological Society in 1838, and was then chosen as one of its Honorary Secretaries, later being elected President in 1857 and again in 1865. He was also successively Secretary (1848–52) and four-times President of the Manchester Literary and Philosophical Society (1862–4, 1870–2, 1876–8, and 1880–2). 

Binney was part of a close Manchester social circle that included James Prescott Joule, William Sturgeon, John Davies and John Leigh.

He was elected a fellow of the Royal Society in 1856 and died at Manchester in 1882.

References

Attribution:

Further reading 

 
 
 
 Secord, A. "Binney, Edward William (1812–1881)", Oxford Dictionary of National Biography, Oxford University Press, accessed 10 August 2007 
Obituaries:
Manchester Examiner and Times, 21 December 1881
Manchester Guardian, 22 December 1881

1812 births
1881 deaths
English geologists
People from Newark and Sherwood (district)
Fellows of the Royal Society
People educated at Queen Elizabeth's High School
Manchester Literary and Philosophical Society